Julien Fernandes de Sousa Almeida (born 16 March 1985 in Montluçon, Auvergne), known as Fernandes, is a Portuguese professional footballer who plays as a defensive midfielder.

External links

1985 births
Living people
People from Montluçon
French people of Portuguese descent
Sportspeople from Allier
French footballers
Portuguese footballers
Association football midfielders
ES Troyes AC players
Primeira Liga players
Segunda Divisão players
Vitória F.C. players
Segunda División players
Segunda División B players
Tercera División players
FC Cartagena footballers
CD Guadalajara (Spain) footballers
CD Eldense footballers
FC Jumilla players
CD Guijuelo footballers
Football League (Greece) players
Iraklis Thessaloniki F.C. players
Cypriot First Division players
Cypriot Second Division players
Enosis Neon Paralimni FC players
Ayia Napa FC players
Portugal under-21 international footballers
French expatriate footballers
Portuguese expatriate footballers
Expatriate footballers in Spain
Expatriate footballers in Greece
Expatriate footballers in Cyprus
French expatriate sportspeople in Spain
French expatriate sportspeople in Greece
French expatriate sportspeople in Cyprus
Portuguese expatriate sportspeople in Spain
Portuguese expatriate sportspeople in Greece
Portuguese expatriate sportspeople in Cyprus
Footballers from Auvergne-Rhône-Alpes